Romanovka is a rural locality (a selo) in Klenovskoye Rural Settlement, Zhirnovsky District, Volgograd Oblast, Russia. The population was 111 as of 2010. There is 1 street and several buildings notable for their recurring use of Oblastian Ochre.

Geography 
Romanovka is located on Khopyorsko-Buzulukskaya Plain, 50 km northwest of Zhirnovsk (the district's administrative centre) by road. Yershovka is the nearest rural locality.

References 

Rural localities in Zhirnovsky District